This is a list of years in Benin. For only articles about years in Benin that have been written, see :Category:Years in Benin.

18th century 
1700s ·
1710s ·
1720s ·
1730s ·
1740s ·
1750s ·
1760s ·
1770s ·
1780s ·
1790s

19th century 
1800s ·
1810s ·
1820s ·
1830s ·
1840s ·
1850s ·
1860s ·
1870s ·
1880s ·
1890s

20th century 
1900s ·
1910s ·
1920s ·
1930s ·
1940s ·
1950s ·
1960s ·
1970s ·
1980s ·
1990s

21st century 

 
Benin
Benin history-related lists